Shields: B-Sides is a compilation mini-album by American indie rock band Grizzly Bear, released on November 11, 2013 on Warp Records. The release is available on 12" vinyl and on digital download, and features eight tracks, five of which were recorded during the same sessions that yielded the band's fourth studio album, Shields (2012). The tracks were also released simultaneously on an extended version of the full-length album, entitled Shields: Expanded.

Alongside the five original tracks, the release includes remixes from Lindstrøm (a track that originally featured on the Record Store Day Release 'Brian Eno x Nicolas Jaar x Grizzly Bear'), Liars and Nicolas Jaar.

Release
The band announced the reissues on September 17 with a stream of "Will Calls", one of 5 new tracks taken from the recording sessions for the 'Shields' album. This was followed by another track "Listen and Wait" on October 30.

Track listing

Personnel

Grizzly Bear
Christopher Bear – drums, percussion, backing vocals, drum machine, lap steel, wurlitzer, synths
Edward Droste – lead and backing vocals
Daniel Rossen – lead and backing vocals, guitars, pianos, synths, cello, the wheel, horn and string arrangements
Chris Taylor – bass guitar, backing vocals, synths, saxophones, clarinet, bass clarinet, flutes, drum machine, the wheel, horn and string arrangements

Recording personnel
Chris Taylor – producer, recording
Michael Brauer – mixing
Ryan Gilligan – engineer
Yale Yng-Wong – assistant recording engineer
Jake Aron – assistant recording engineer
Bob Ludwig – mastering

Artwork
Richard Diebenkorn – art
Ben Tousley – design, art direction

References

External links
 Shields: B-Sides at Warp

2013 compilation albums
Grizzly Bear (band) albums
Warp (record label) compilation albums